The 5th Golden Eagle Awards were held April 25, 1987, in Xi'an, Shanxi province.  Nominees and winners are listed below, winners are in bold.

Best Television Series
not awarded this year
Triumph in Midnight 凯旋在子夜
Dream in Red Mansions 红楼梦
Begonia 秋海棠

Best Mini-series
not awarded this year
Afloat in Changjiang 长江第一飘
Understanding 理解万岁
One Foot Champion 独脚冠军
Under the Tree 大树底下

Best Lead Actor in a Television Series
Shi Zhaoqi for Triumph in Midnight

Best Lead Actress in a Television Series
Zhu Lin for Triumph in Midnight

Best Supporting Actor in a Television Series
Wang Qun for Zhen San

Best Supporting Actress in a Television Series
Deng Jie for Dream in Red Mansions

Best Dubbing Actor
Zheng Jun for Sergeant Paris

Best Dubbing Actress
Liu Guangning for Rage of Angels

References

External links

1987
1987 in Chinese television
Mass media in Xi'an